The 1971 Oakland Raiders season was the team's 12th season. The Raiders failed to make the playoffs as their main rivals, the Kansas City Chiefs, would win the division title.

This was the only season between 1966 to 1977 in which the Raiders did not win the AFL/AFC West title.

Offseason

Draft

Roster

Regular season

Schedule

Game notes

Week 2

Week 4

Source: Pro-Football-Reference.com

Week 14

Source: Pro-Football-Reference.com

Standings

Awards and honors

References

Raiders on Pro Football Reference
Raiders on Database Football

Oakland
Oakland Raiders seasons
Oakland